Jan Novacki (born 4 December 1958) is an English former professional footballer who played as a winger in the Football League for York City and was on the books of Bolton Wanderers without making a league appearance. He was an England youth international.

References

Living people
Footballers from Manchester
English footballers
England youth international footballers
Association football wingers
Bolton Wanderers F.C. players
York City F.C. players
English Football League players
1958 births